Jeffrey “Jeff” Houser is a retired American soccer forward who played professionally in the USL A-League.

Houser attended the University of Tampa, playing on the men’s soccer team in 1995 and 1996.  He transferred to the University of South Florida for the 1997 and 1998 seasons.  In 1999, Houser turned professional with the Lehigh Valley Steam in the USL A-League.  In 2000, he tore his anterior cruciate ligament during a pre-season tryout with the Kansas City Wizards.  This forced him to sit out the 2000 season.  In 2001, he returned to the field with the Nashville Metros of the USL A-League.  He finished the season tied for third on the league goals list.  He finished his injury-shortened, three-year professional career with the Pittsburgh Riverhounds in 2002.

Career

Life

References

Living people
1977 births
American soccer players
Lehigh Valley Steam players
Nashville Metros players
Pittsburgh Riverhounds SC players
South Florida Bulls men's soccer players
Tampa Spartans men's soccer players
A-League (1995–2004) players
Association football forwards